The Great Smoky Mountains Railroad  is a freight and heritage railroad based in Bryson City, North Carolina, United States. Since late 1999, the railroad is currently owned and operated by American Heritage Railways, Inc., which also owns and operates the Durango and Silverton Narrow Gauge Railroad (D&SNG) in Colorado. The railroad operates excursion trains on the former Southern Railway Murphy branch line between Dillsboro and Nantahala, North Carolina. Since then, the GSMR became one of the most popular tourist railroads in the United States, with about 200,000 passengers each year.

Background

The Great Smoky Mountains Railway (GSMR) owns  of the Murphy Branch, a former branch line of the Southern Railway between Dillsboro and Nantahala, North Carolina. It began operations in 1988, through a lease agreement between the NCDOT and Malcom and Joan MacNeill. With help of a team of investors, the MacNeils secured the lease within 48 hours of the Norfolk Southern Railway dispatching work trains to the Murphy Branch to begin dismantling the track. The GSMR route uses a route which passes through "fertile valleys, a tunnel and across river gorges" in the Great Smoky Mountains of Western North Carolina. Several miles of the line between the far western end of the Nantahala Gorge and Andrews are out of service. The GSMR tourist excursions use the line between Bryson City and Nantahala ( in length) and the line between Bryson City and Dillsboro ( in length).

In late 1999, the MacNeills sold the GSMR property to the American Heritage Railways, who were the owners of the Durango and Silverton Narrow Gauge Railroad (D&SNG) in Colorado. Additionally, the bright and colorful blue, yellow and red "circus train" livery was dropped in favor of the new Tuscan red and gold stripe livery. On March 9, 2000, the Great Smoky Mountain Railway was renamed to the Great Smoky Mountains Railroad. The GSMR would eventually become one of the most popular tourist railroads in the United States with about 200,000 passengers each year. In addition to operating tourists trains, the railroad has transported freight via an interchange with the Blue Ridge Southern Railroad in Sylva near Jackson Paper Manufacturing.

In 2004, GSMR debuted its "Polar Express" train ride, based on the newly released movie and licensed through Warner Brothers. This ride has annually been a major economy boost for the railroad and the town of Bryson City. In 2019, GSMR broke all attendance records, with more than 91,000 people riding the Polar Express excursion alone.

In 2007, GSMR made the decision to close their Dillsboro depot and relocate their headquarters from Dillsboro to Bryson City due to their dispute with the Dillsboro Town Council not being resolved. However, the Tuckasegee River excursions between Dillsboro and Bryson City continued with the trips starting at Bryson City and lay over in Dillsboro.

In March 2020, the COVID-19 pandemic outbreak caused the GSMR to suspend operations. They resumed operations on June 4, 2020, with provisions for public health, such as social distancing.

Equipment

Locomotives
The railroad has five operational diesel locomotives, GP9s Nos. 1751 and 1755, GP30 (upgrade to a GP30-3) No. 2467, GP35 (upgrade to a GP38-3M) No. 1009, and GP38-3 No. 2668.

GSMR owned one operational steam locomotive; S160 2-8-0 "Consolidation" type No. 1702, which was built by Baldwin Locomotive Works in September 1942 for the U.S. Army during World War II. In 1991, it was purchased by the GSMR until 2005, when it was taken out of service due to firebox issues. In 2012, the GSMR made an agreement with the Swain County of North Carolina donating $700,000 to construct a new steam locomotive workshop for the restoration of No. 1702 and installing a new turntable in Bryson City for the locomotive to be turned around. Afterwards, the restoration work of No. 1702 began in mid 2014 and completed in late July 2016 with the locomotive reentering excursion service.

The railroad owns another 2-8-0 steam locomotive, Southern Railway Ks-1 No. 722, which originally worked on the former Murphy Branch from 1904 to 1952 and operated for the Southern Railway's steam excursion program from 1970 to 1980 until GSMR purchased it in late 2000, where it currently remains in storage. As of 2023, it has been said that were proposed plans to begin the restoration.

The GSMR had purchased a third steam locomotive, a former Swedish State Railways 4-6-0 #1149, in 2010 from the defunct Belfast and Moosehead Lake Railroad. This engine was originally slated to be moved to the GSMR in spring 2011. However, the engine continued to remain on the B&ML for two more years. Ultimately, the GSMR deemed the engine's move too costly and instead sold the engine to the Discovery Park of America in Union City, Tennessee.

Current locomotive roster

Retired locomotives
These locomotives were retired in 2022.

Towns and attractions served
 Dillsboro
 Whittier
 Bryson City
 Fontana Lake
 The Nantahala Outdoor Center

Smoky Mountain Trains Museum
The railroad owns the Smoky Mountain Trains Museum in Bryson City, North Carolina; located across Greenlee Street from the Bryson City Depot. The museum features a collection of over 7,000 Lionel model engines, cars and accessories, a large model train layout, a children's activity center, and a gift shop.

Popular culture
The famous train wreck scene in the 1993 Warner Brothers blockbuster movie The Fugitive starring Harrison Ford and Tommy Lee Jones was filmed in Dillsboro along the Great Smoky Mountains Railroad.

The Great Smoky Mountains Railroad was also used in the filming of 1996 Warner Brothers comedy My Fellow Americans starring Jack Lemmon and James Garner when they stumble on to a charter train full of UNC-Chapel Hill fans headed for the NCAA Final Four.

Train scenes in the 1999 DreamWorks SKG film Forces of Nature starring Ben Affleck and Sandra Bullock were also filmed on the Great Smoky Mountains Railroad.

GSMR's No. 1702 steam locomotive was featured in the 1966 film, This Property Is Condemned, starring Natalie Wood, Robert Redford, and Charles Bronson.

See also
List of heritage railroads in the United States

References

Bibliography

External links

Official website
American Heritage Railways
North Carolina Railway Association

North Carolina railroads
Heritage railroads in North Carolina
Transportation in Swain County, North Carolina
Transportation in Jackson County, North Carolina
Transportation in Cherokee County, North Carolina
Transportation in Graham County, North Carolina
Companies based in North Carolina
Tourist attractions in Swain County, North Carolina
Tourist attractions in Jackson County, North Carolina
Tourist attractions in Cherokee County, North Carolina
Tourist attractions in Graham County, North Carolina
Spin-offs of the Norfolk Southern Railway
Museums in Swain County, North Carolina
Railroad museums in North Carolina
Western North Carolina